Victor W. Miller (born October 19, 1951) is an American politician who currently serves in the Kansas House of Representatives representing the 58th district and a former Kansas state senator.

Political Career
Miller was originally elected to the Kansas House in 1978 from the 53rd House district, serving from 1979 to 1984. In 1984, he ran for the Kansas State Senate in the 18th Senate district, but was defeated by Republican Jeanne Hoferer. After leaving the House in 1984, he served as a County Commissioner in Shawnee County, Kansas, then as a Topeka Municipal Court Judge.

In 2016, he re-entered the legislature, winning election to the 58th House district. He served one term there before being appointed to the 18th Senate district in January of 2019, after the seat was left vacant when Laura Kelly resigned to serve as Governor of Kansas. Miller finished out the remaining two years of Kelly's term, and then returned to his House seat, successfully running for the House in 2020. During his tenure in the Kansas Senate, he served as Ranking Minority Member of the Senate Judiciary Committee.

Kansas House of Representatives Committee Assignments 2021-2022
Ranking Minority Member of Elections
Insurance and Pensions
Federal and State Affairs
Redistricting
Commerce, Labor and Economic Development
Joint Committee on Special Claims Against the State

Kansas Senate Committee Assignments 2019-2020 
Ranking Minority Member of Judiciary
Assessment and Taxation
Select Committee on Federal Tax Code Implementation
Joint Committee on Pensions, Investment and Benefits
2019 Special Committee on Judiciary

Kansas House of Representatives Committee Assignments 2017-2018
Ranking Minority Member of Elections
Federal and State Affairs
Judiciary
2017 Special Committee on Elections

Personal
On May 7, 2019, he was arrested on suspicion of drunk driving when he drove his car into a Topeka ditch. He was charged with DUI on November 25, 2019 by a special prosecutor assigned the case to avoid conflicts of interest. Miller agreed to enter a diversion program to resolve the charge on July 14, 2020.

References

1951 births
20th-century American politicians
21st-century American politicians
County commissioners in Kansas
Democratic Party Kansas state senators
Democratic Party members of the Kansas House of Representatives
Kansas state court judges
Living people
Politicians from Topeka, Kansas